Neher is a surname, and may refer to:
 André Neher, Jewish scholar and philosopher (1914–1988)
 Carola Neher, German actress (1900-1942)
 Caspar Neher, stage-designer (1897–1962)
 Erwin Neher, German biophysicist (born 1944)
 Fred Neher, American cartoonist (1903-2001)
 Jim Neher, baseball pitcher (1889-1951)
 Lambertus Neher, Dutch politician (1889-1967)
 Stephan Jakob Neher, Church historian (1829-1902)

It may also refer to:
 Neher–McGrath calculations for underground cable temperatures 
 Neher–Elseffer House, one of the rare pre-American Revolution frame houses